Janarion Grant (born November 20, 1993) is an American professional football player who is a return specialist for the Winnipeg Blue Bombers of the Canadian Football League (CFL). He won the 107th Grey Cup with the Blue Bombers when they defeated the Hamilton Tiger-Cats 33–12. He played college football at Rutgers and signed with the Baltimore Ravens as an undrafted free agent in 2018.

College career
Grant attended and played college football at Rutgers from 2013 to 2017. He was a returner in college over five seasons. He recorded 115 kick returns for 2,857 net yards and five kick return touchdowns to go along with 52 punt returns for 588 net yards and three punt return touchdowns.

Collegiate statistics

Professional career

Baltimore Ravens
Grant signed with the Baltimore Ravens as an undrafted free agent on May 7, 2018. He made the Ravens final roster as the team's primary kick and punt returner. However, on September 22, 2018, Grant was waived by the Ravens after two fumbles in as many games. He was re-signed to the practice squad on September 25, 2018.

Hamilton Tiger-Cats
Grant signed with the Hamilton Tiger-Cats on June 3, 2019. He was added to the practice roster after training camp, but was released on June 18, 2019.

Winnipeg Blue Bombers
Grant was signed by the Winnipeg Blue Bombers on July 23, 2019. He scored his first and second CFL touchdowns on August 8, 2019, in his first CFL game on punt returns against the Calgary Stampeders. His 222 punt-return yards in the game set a Blue Bombers franchise record and ranked as the third-highest single-game in CFL history behind only Gizmo Williams 232 in 1991 and Keith Stokes 224 vs Montreal in 2002. Grant finished the season with three punt return touchdowns and also had one missed FG returned for 61 yards. Grants abilities on special teams helped the team as they would go on to win the 2019 Grey Cup against the Hamilton Tiger-Cats. 

After the CFL canceled the 2020 season due to the COVID-19 pandemic, Grant chose to opt-out of his contract with the Blue Bombers on August 31, 2020. He signed a one-year contract extension with Winnipeg on February 4, 2021. Once again, Grant brought his electric punt return skills to the field as he averaged 11 yards a punt return through the 2021 season. This included another touchdown return for 63 yards against the BC Lions on October 23. In the CFL West Division final against Saskatchewan, Grant returned a missed field goal for 58 yards to the Winnipeg 39 yard-line. This led to an Andrew Harris touchdown as the Bombers would win 21-17 on their way to their second consecutive Grey Cup. Grant and the Bombers would win the 108th Grey Cup, their second title in a row with a 33-25 victory in overtime against the Hamilton Tiger-Cats. After becoming a free agent in February 2022, Grant and the Bombers agreed to a new contract on April 13, 2022.

Professional statistics

References

External links
Winnipeg Blue Bombers bio
Baltimore Ravens bio
Rutgers Scarlet Knights bio

1993 births
Living people
People from Pasco County, Florida
Players of American football from Florida
Sportspeople from the Tampa Bay area
American football wide receivers
American football return specialists
Rutgers Scarlet Knights football players
Baltimore Ravens players
Hamilton Tiger-Cats players
Winnipeg Blue Bombers players
Canadian football return specialists
Pasco High School (Florida) alumni